Henry Hereford is an English actor. Most recently Hereford performed in multiple sketches in the up coming Australian TV show Wham Bam Thank You Ma'am  on ABC2.  Prior to this he worked on NBC series  Crossbones (2014) starring John Malkovich, where significantly he played two roles in the first season. He played Frederick Nightingale in episode 1 and then the recurring role of The Wild Man from episode 4 onwards.

Filmography

Film

Television

Video Game

References

External links
http://www.henryhereford.com/

Living people
People from Rinteln
Alumni of the Drama Studio London
21st-century English male actors
People educated at Radley College
Year of birth missing (living people)